E. W. Everson (April 29, 1857 – March 28, 1931) was a pioneer homesteader in Dakota Territory. He later served as a member of the North Dakota State House of Representatives.

Evan W. Everson was born at Hveem in Østre Toten, Oppland, Norway. He was  one of nine children born to Andrew Everson (1826–1892) and Johanna Everson (1828–1904). The family emigrated to the United States in 1866. Everson filed on a homestead near Walum in Griggs County during 1880.

Everson served as a justice of the peace for 16 years prior to his election to the North Dakota state legislature. He served in the North Dakota House of Representatives for three terms (1912, 1914 and 1916) representing the 16th District (Griggs and Steele counties). He was later a founder and two term President of the North Dakota Independent Voters Association which was formed in 1918. From 1923–1928, he operated a general store in partnership with Oscar Gilbertson, who was his son-in-law. He died at his home in 1931. His funeral was conducted at St. Olaf Lutheran Church Church in Walum.

References

Members of the North Dakota House of Representatives
1857 births
1931 deaths
People from Oppland
People from Østre Toten
Norwegian emigrants to the United States
Independent Voters Association politicians
American Lutherans